The International Geoscience Education Organisation (IGEO) is an international non-governmental organization aimed to promote the improvement of the quality of geoscience education worldwide.

About 
The International Geoscience Education Organisation  was created in the framework of the 3rd International Conference on Geoscience Education in Sydney, Australia.  It conducts research activities for the enhancement of quality in geoscience education over the world and searching for policies on that subject.

Activities 
IGEO organizes the following events:

 GeoSciEd:  The conference on Geoscience Education which take places every 4 years.
 Session on geoscience education during the International Geological Congress.
 IESO: International Earth Sciences Olympiad and it was established as one of the major activities of IGEO.
 Commission on Geoscience Education at IUGS (COGE): team of international experts which work to include new policies on geoscience education at regional level. 
Geoscience Education Survey: IGEO reports on the subject to collaborate with the nations over the world in looking for solutions on the inclusion of geosciences in the curricula properly, especially in the countries where mining resources are the base of economy.

Teaching Resources 
IGEO share content to be used by teachers in education at school level. The material is reviewed by experts with the goal of including in the scholar curricula and effective teaching methods in geoscience education.

References

External links 
 

International scientific organizations
International nongovernmental organizations
Earth sciences organizations